Sandro Luis López Olmos (born October 26, 1967 in Rosario, Santa Fe) is an Argentine judoka, who played for the heavyweight category. He also competed in the middleweight division at the 1988 Summer Olympics in Seoul, South Korea, and at the 1992 Summer Olympics in Barcelona, Spain.

At age forty, Lopez made an official comeback from his sixteen-year absence and his third appearance at the 2008 Summer Olympics in Beijing. He switched from a heavier class by competing in the men's heavyweight class (+100 kg). Unfortunately, he lost the first preliminary match, with an ippon and a yoko shiho gatame (side four quarter hold), to Peru's Carlos Zegarra.

References

External links

NBC 2008 Olympics profile

Argentine male judoka
1967 births
Living people
Olympic judoka of Argentina
Judoka at the 1988 Summer Olympics
Judoka at the 1992 Summer Olympics
Judoka at the 2008 Summer Olympics
Sportspeople from Rosario, Santa Fe